is a Japanese professional football team based in Iwata, located in Shizuoka Prefecture. They currently play in the J2 League, Japan's second tier of professional league football.

Name origin 
The team name Júbilo means 'joy' in Spanish and Portuguese.

History

Origins and rise to the top

The team started out as the company team for Yamaha Motor Corporation in 1970. After making its way through the Shizuoka and Tōkai football leagues, it played in the Japan Soccer League until it reorganized as the J.League at the end of 1992.

Their first glory happened when they won both the Emperor's Cup and promotion as champions of the JSL Division 2 in 1982. They won their first Japanese league title in the 1987/88 season. Due to problems in the upcoming professionalization, Yamaha decided to relegate themselves and not be one of the J.League founder members.

They finished in 2nd place of the JFL 1st division, a division below the top flight, in 1993 and were promoted to the J1 league for 1994. The team welcomed Marius Johan Ooft as its manager, as well as the Brazil national team captain Dunga and a number of foreign players to build a winning team. Dunga's football philosophy deeply influenced the club, initially as a player and currently as an advisor.

Glory years

In a seven-year period between 1997 and 2003, the club won a number of titles relying on Japanese players instead of foreigners who may leave on a transfer during the middle of the season. Within this period Júbilo won the J.League title three times, finished second three more and won each of the domestic cup competitions once. In 1999 they were also crowned Champions of Asia after winning the final match against Esteghlal F.C. and
121.000 spectators in Azadi Stadium.

In one of the most fruitful periods in J.League history, Júbilo broke several records and created some new ones. Amongst these are the most goals scored in a season (107 in 1998); the fewest goals conceded in a season (26 in 2001); the biggest goal difference (plus 68 goals in 1998); and the largest win (9–1 against Cerezo Osaka in 1998). In 2002, the team won both stages of the championship, a first in J.League history, and the same year the team had a record seven players selected for the J.League Team of the Year. All of these records still stand today.

Between 1997 and 2003 Iwata were one of the most successful teams in the J. League. Over this seven-year spell Jubilo finished outside the top two of J1 just once, winning the league title on three occasions. This period also saw a number of cup final appearances, including winning the Emperor’s Cup, the J. League Cup, and the Asian Champions League once each.

Post-glory years

Since their last cup triumph in the 2003 Emperor's Cup, the squad which took them to such heights began to age. Without similarly skilled replacements coming through the youth team or from outside, Júbilo's power started to fade, and in 2007 the club ended the season in a record worst position of 9th. Perhaps more concerning to Júbilo supporters is their eclipse in recent seasons by bitter local rivals Shimizu S-Pulse who, in ending the season above Júbilo every year since 2006, have become Shizuoka prefecture's premier performing team. In 2008 they finished 16th out of 18 – their lowest position in the 18-club table – but kept their J1 position by defeating Vegalta Sendai in the promotion/relegation playoff.

In 2013 season, it took them until 8th week to make their first win in the league matches, and never move up higher than 16th since they were ranked down to 17th as of the end of 5th week. Then eventually suffered their first relegation to 2014 J.League Division 2 after they were defeated by Sagan Tosu at their 31st week match.
Júbilo were promoted back to J1 in 2015 after finishing runners-up. After a 18th place finish in 2019, Iwata were relegated to J2 for 2020. The following year, Júbilo won J2 and were promoted for the 2022 J1 League season.

On 2022, Júbilo couldn't find their way into success throughout the season, with forgettable campaigns being made in each competition. In the J.League Cup, the team saw an early elimination at the group stage, finishing third at their group after losing half their matches. In the Emperor's Cup, they were eliminated in the Round of 16 by Tokyo Verdy at extra-time, despite looking promising after 5–2 win against Matsumoto Yamaga on the 2nd round. In the J1 League, their situation became worse, staying the last 16 rounds of the league season without leaving the relegation zone, having the relegation to the J2 confirmed on the penultimate round. 

On 19 October 2022, Júbilo Iwata announced through their media accounts that for both transfers windows of the 2023 season, the club would be unable to make new signings after a ban was imposed by FIFA and the CAS. The ban, however, didn't applied to youth team promotions of Júbilo's academy system, and for players returning from loan transfers. The decision was made based on issues regarding Fabián González's contract with the club, as the player supposedly cancelled a contract signed with an unnamed Thai club without a justifiable reason. According to Júbilo, at the time of his signing (in the pre-season) they were unaware of the previous contract González signed with the Thai club. The situation became public after the Thai club left a complaint highlighting the transfer issue situation to FIFA's Dispute Resolution Chamber on April 2022. González was also imposed a punishment by FIFA, being suspended from any participation in official matches for four months. The transfer ban also led to a provisional contract cancellation of Shu Morooka on 17 November 2022, who had during the season signed a provisional contract for the 2023 season, after graduating from university. Then, on the same day, it was announced he would join Kashima Antlers instead. Later on 20 December, the club filed an appeal about the CAS decision over the subject, but it was denied on 22 December.

Rivalries
Júbilo's closest professional rivals are S-Pulse from Shizuoka. Júbilo also has rivalries with Kashima Antlers and Yokohama Marinos, with whom they traded the Japanese league championship since the late 1980s. During the Japan Soccer League days, they had a more local derby with Honda, across the Tenryu in Hamamatsu, but as Honda has long resisted professionalism, competitive matches between them since 1994 are a rarity.

Stadium 
Jubilo Iwata plays at the Yamaha Stadium. For big fixtures such as the Shizuoka Derby with Shimizu S-Pulse and against some of the top teams in J1, Júbilo play at the much larger Ecopa Stadium in Fukuroi City, a venue built specifically for the 2002 FIFA World Cup finals. They practice at Okubo Ground in Iwata and Iwata Sports Park Yumeria.

Record as J.League member

Honours

National
As both Yamaha (1972–1992) and Júbilo Iwata (1992–present)

League
Japan Soccer League/J.League Division 1 (first tier)
Champions (4): 1987–88, 1997, 1999, 2002
Japan Soccer League Division 2/Japan Football League/J2 League (second tier)
Champions (3): 1982, 1992, 2021
Regional Promotion Series
Champions (2): 1977, 1978

Cups
J.League Cup
Winners (2): 1998, 2010
Emperor's Cup
Winners (2): 1982, 2003
Japanese Super Cup
Winners (3): 2000, 2003, 2004

International
Asian Club Championship
Champions (1): 1998–99
Asian Super Cup
Champions (1): 1999
Suruga Bank Championship
Winners (1): 2011

Players

Current squad

Out on loan

Reserve squad (U-18s)

World Cup players
The following players have been selected by their country in the World Cup, while playing for Júbilo Iwata:
  Dunga (1998)
  Hiroshi Nanami (1998)
  Masashi Nakayama (1998, 2002)
  Toshihiro Hattori (1998, 2002)
  Takashi Fukunishi (2002, 2006)
  Kim Jin-Kyu (2006)
  Yūichi Komano (2010)
  Masahiko Inoha (2014)

Award winners
The following players have won the awards while at Júbilo Iwata:

J.League Player of the Year
 Dunga (1997)
 Masashi Nakayama (1998)
 Toshiya Fujita (2001)
 Naohiro Takahara (2002)
J.League Top Scorer
 Masashi Nakayama (1998, 2000)
 Naohiro Takahara (2002)
 Ryoichi Maeda (2009, 2010)
J.League Best XI
 Hiroshi Nanami (1996, 1997, 1998, 2002)
 Dunga (1997, 1998)
 Tomoaki Ōgami (1997)
 Masashi Nakayama (1997, 1998, 2000, 2002)
 Daisuke Oku (1998)
 Toshiya Fujita (1998, 2001, 2002)
 Makoto Tanaka (1998)
 Takashi Fukunishi (1999, 2001, 2002, 2003)
 Arno van Zwam (2001)
 Toshihiro Hattori (2001)
 Go Oiwa (2001)
 Hideto Suzuki (2002)
 Makoto Tanaka (2002)
 Naohiro Takahara (2002)
 Yoshikatsu Kawaguchi (2006)
 Ryoichi Maeda (2009, 2010)
 Yūichi Komano (2012)
J.League Rookie of the Year
 Robert Cullen (2005)
J.League Cup MVP
 Nobuo Kawaguchi (1998)
 Ryoichi Maeda (2010)
J.League Cup New Hero Award
 Hiroshi Nanami (1996)
 Naohiro Takahara (1998)
 J2 League Top Scorer 
 Jay Bothroyd (2015)

Club captains
 Shinichi Morishita(1994) 
 Mitsunori Yoshida (1995)
 Masashi Nakayama (1996–1998)
 Toshihiro Hattori (1999–2005)
 Takashi Fukunishi (2006)
 Hideto Suzuki (2007)
 Yoshikatsu Kawaguchi (2008)
 Ryo Takano (2009)
 Daisuke Nasu (2010–2011)
 Daiki Yamada (2012–2013)
 Daisuke Matsui (2014)
 Ryoichi Maeda (2014)
 Kota Ueda (2015–2016)
 Kentaro Oi (2017)
 Nagisa Sakurauchi (2018–2020)

Former players
Players with senior international caps:

Club officials
For the 2023 season.

Executive staff

Top team staff

Academy staff

Managers

Kit evolution

In popular culture
In the manga series – Captain Tsubasa, three characters were players of Júbilo Iwata. The midfielders Taro Misaki and Hanji Urabe, and the defender Ryo Ishizaki.

References

External links
Official Jubilo Iwata site
 Official Jubilo Iwata site

 
J.League clubs
Japan Soccer League clubs
Football clubs in Japan
Yamaha Corporation
Association football clubs established in 1972
Emperor's Cup winners
Japanese League Cup winners
Sports teams in Shizuoka Prefecture
1972 establishments in Japan
Japan Football League (1992–1998) clubs
AFC Champions League winning clubs
Asian Super Cup winning clubs
Iwata, Shizuoka